The Durbar festival is an annual cultural, religious and equestrian festival celebrated in several northern cities of Nigeria including Kano, Katsina, Sokoto, Zazzau, Bauchi, Bida and Ilorin. The festival marks the end of Ramadan and also coincides with the Muslim festivities of Eid al-Adha and Eid al-Fitri.

It begins with prayers at dawn, followed by a colourful mounted parade of the Emir and his retinue of horsemen, musicians, and artillerymen. At the Durbar festivals noblemen travel to pay homage to the Emir and reaffirm their loyalty to their various emirates.

The festival dates back to the 14th century in Kano, the largest city in Northern Nigeria. The Kano durbar festival is a four-day extravaganza of opulence, horsemanship, and street parades.

Etymology 
The word Durbar is of Persian origin and it was first linked to ceremonial assemblies marking the proclamation of Queen Victoria as the Empress of colonial India in 1877. But the native Hausa use the term "Hawan Sallah" to describe the festival - with Hawan meaning the "Mount of Eid", referencing the physical mounting of the horse.

History

Pre-colonial era 
Historians say the "Hawan Daushe" (Mount of Daushe) was introduced to Kano during the reign of Muhammadu Rumfa in the 1400s. During and after the Fulani Jihad horses were used in warfare to protect the Emirate. Each noble household was expected to defend the Emirate by forming a regiment. Once a year, the regiments would gather for a military parade to demonstrate allegiance to their ruler, by showcasing their horsemanship, readiness for war, and loyalty.

The Jahi race is the Durbar's centrepiece and the Hawan Daushe's final item on the programme. Several horse riders in the emirate charge full speed towards the emir, then abruptly stop when they approach him and wave their sword or flag before exiting. The Emir and his entourage ride through a number of quarters housing historically significant families before returning to the palace via the Kofar Kudu gate for the Jahi - the horsemen's salute. The Palace guards march into position after the Jahi and fire several gunshots into the air, signaling the end of the Hawan Daushe Durbar.

Hawan Sallah – the Festival Riding, followed by Hawan Daushe, Hawan Nassarawa, and Hawan Doriya. The most fascinating and impressive aspect of the Durbar celebration is the Hawan Daushe, which also includes the "Jahi", which attracts viewers from all over the world.

The Hawan Daushe began as the Emir and his entourage ride out of Gidan Rumfa – the Emir's Palace, past Kofar Kwaru to Babban Daki – the palace of the Queen Mother, where he pays tribute to his mother.

Colonial era 
Other say that the Durbar festival was introduced to Nigeria by colonial administrators with political objectives in mind. The word Durbar is of Persian origin and it was first linked to ceremonial assemblies marking the proclamation of Queen Victoria as the Empress of colonial India in 1877. In Nigeria, the events then were ceremonial in nature. The first Durbar was held in 1911, subsequent ceremonies were held in 1924, 1925, 1948, 1960 and 1972. The ceremonies linked together pre-colonial aspects of martial display, colonist-created assemblies and celebrations of important events in Northern Nigeria.

Independence
The Durbar festival featured prominently in the 2nd World Black and African Festival of Arts and Culture, sometimes known as Festac 77. Since Festac, the colonial origin was gradually phased out and the events were linked with pre-colonial traditions such as the importance of horses for military purposes and ceremonies in the Bornu Empire and the ceremonies of "Hawan Sallah" and "Hawan Idi".

See also
Festivals in Nigeria

References 

Festivals established in 1911
Festivals in Nigeria
Islam in Nigeria
Islamic festivals
Islamic terminology